Backcountry Hunters & Anglers (BHA) is a non-profit sportsmen's organization that is based in Montana, USA. The group looks to preserve North America's outdoor heritage of hunting and fishing through public education and advocacy. Backcountry Hunters & Anglers works to prevent the development of wild land in North America and follows the North American Model of Wildlife Conservation as a basis for its positions.

The organization was "born around an Oregon campfire in 2004" and has chapters in 48  states, as well as the Canadian provinces of Alberta and British Columbia, and the Yukon Territory. The organization has 40,000 members in North America.

Land Tawney is the group's President/CEO.

Issues
Backcountry Hunters & Anglers main issues are:

Preventing excessive off-road vehicle traffic on wild land
Educating the public on hunting and fishing
Preserving natural forests and public lands from development

The group supports federal ownership of federal public lands and is opposed to legislation that would transfer ownership of these lands to states or private interests. Executive Director Land Tawney has stated, "We see states trying to take over national forests and BLM areas as a threat to public lands that could lead to privatization and loss of habitat and access."

The organization supports legislation to ban the use of drones while hunting, calling the technique unethical.

Local BHA Chapters

Provinces with chapters in Canada 
 Alberta
 British Columbia
 Yukon Territory

States with chapters in the United States 
 Alaska
 Kentucky
 Washington
 Montana
 Idaho
 Oregon
 Wyoming
 California
 Nevada
 Texas
 Utah
 Colorado
 South Dakota
 Minnesota
 Wisconsin
 Michigan
 Maine
 Vermont
 New Hampshire
 New York
 New Mexico 
 North Dakota
 Massachusetts
 Rhode Island
 Connecticut
 Maryland
 Tennessee
 Mississippi
 Arkansas
 Louisiana 
 Georgia
 Florida
 Virginia
 Arizona

References

2004 establishments in Oregon
Recreational fishing organizations
Hunting organizations
Non-profit organizations based in Montana
Organizations established in 2004